Laicization may refer to:

 Loss of clerical state (Catholic Church)
 An occasional alternative term for defrocking of clergy defrocking of clergy